Svetlana Kuznetsova and Arantxa Sánchez Vicario were the defending champions, but none competed this year.

Tatiana Perebiynis and Silvija Talaja won the title by defeating qualifiers Maret Ani and Libuše Průšová 6–4, 6–2 in the final.

Seeds

Draw

Draw

References

External links
 Official results archive (ITF)
 Official results archive (WTA)

Orange Warsaw Open
2003 WTA Tour